José Barroso Chávez (1925 in Mexico City – February 5, 2008 in Mexico City) was a Red Cross official.

He graduated from La Salle University. He was the President of the International Federation of Red Cross and Red Crescent Societies from 1965 to 1977. Chávez was the first Latin American person to be the President of the Red Cross.

External links
 Jose Barroso 1965-77 Red Cross

1925 births
2008 deaths
Presidents of the International Federation of Red Cross and Red Crescent Societies